Four Heatons is the name used for four neighbourhoods, Heaton Chapel, Heaton Mersey, Heaton Moor and Heaton Norris, which form a suburban area of Stockport. Situated north of the River Mersey, they are historically in Lancashire, England. It is a commuter zone, with greenbelt and a conservation area, and is coterminous with the SK4 postcode district.

The opening of railway stations, first at Heaton Norris in 1840 and then at Heaton Chapel in 1853, resulted in the suburbanisation of the Four Heatons.

The area is home to various retailers, as well as bars, delis, independent music venues and a cinema.

In 2009, local businesses and traders formed a voluntary organisation in the area called the Four Heatons Traders Association. The organisation was a focal point for community regeneration projects, however its closure was announced in 2021.

A Friends of Heaton Chapel Station group (FofHCS) was formed in August 2011 to improve the station, by looking after the gardens and through various award-winning projects and art projects. FofHCS also want to encourage greater use of the station by promoting the facilities, services and destinations served, and by lobbying for improvements where necessary.

References

External links
 Four Heatons Council Page
 Four Heatons Traders Association Page
 Friends of Heaton Chapel Station

Areas of Greater Manchester
Geography of the Metropolitan Borough of Stockport